Lasionycta gelida is a moth of the family Noctuidae. It is known from three specimens from the British Columbia Coast Range.

It occurs in rocky tundra slightly above timberline.

The wingspan is 31 mm for males and 36 mm for females. Adults are on wing from late July to mid-August.

External links
A Revision of Lasionycta Aurivillius (Lepidoptera, Noctuidae) for North America and notes on Eurasian species, with descriptions of 17 new species, 6 new subspecies, a new genus, and two new species of Tricholita Grote

Lasionycta
Moths described in 2009